Bastian Schulz (born 10 July 1985) is a German former footballer.

Career
Schulz began his career with Hannover 96 in summer 1997 in the youth side and was promoted to the first team in June 2008.

On 20 June 2009, he announced his departure from Hannover 96 after twelve years and signed a three-year contract with 1. FC Kaiserslautern. After two seasons with Kaiserslautern, Schulz left the Bundesliga and joined RB Leipzig.

He announced his retirement on 4 January 2018 after playing for VfL Osnabrück since 2016.

References

External links

Bastian Schulz at Kicker

German footballers
1985 births
Living people
Hannover 96 players
1. FC Kaiserslautern players
RB Leipzig players
VfL Wolfsburg II players
VfL Osnabrück players
Bundesliga players
Association football midfielders
2. Bundesliga players
3. Liga players
Regionalliga players
Footballers from Hanover